Subhash Rukmaiah Guttedar  (Guttedar Subhash Rukmayya ) is an Indian politician and current Member of the 2018 Karnataka Legislative Assembly from Aland (Vidhana Sabha constituency) in Bharatiya Janata Party ticket. He was elected to Karnataka Legislative Assembly (MLA)  from Aland vidhana sabha constituency in the year 2008, 1999 and 1994 and in 2013 and 2004 Karnataka Legislative Assembly he lost from Aland vidhana sabha constituency  . He has two sons, Santosh S Guttedar and Harshanand S Guttedar (Three times ZP Member) and one daughter.

Political career
2018 MLA Aland Vidhana Sabha constituency as BJP candidate.
2008 - 2013 MLA Aland Vidhana Sabha constituency as Janata Dal (Secular)
1999 - 2004 MLA Aland constituency as Janata Dal (Secular)
1994- 1999 MLA Aland constituency as Karnataka Congress Party
2013 contested from Aland constituency to Karnataka Legislative Assembly as JD(S) candidate and lost.
2004 contested from Aland constituency to Karnataka Legislative Assembly as INC candidate and lost.

References

Living people
Bharatiya Janata Party politicians from Karnataka
People from Kalaburagi
1951 births
Karnataka MLAs 1999–2004
Karnataka MLAs 2008–2013
Karnataka MLAs 2018–2023